The Ju-jitsu competition at the World Games 2017 took place from July 28 to July 29, in Wrocław in Poland, at the GEM Sports Complex.

Participating nations
128 competitors, from 41 nations, participated in the tournament.

Medal table

Medalists

Duo

Men's fighting

Men's ne-waza

Women's fighting

Women's ne-waza

Mixed

External links
 The World Games 2017
 Result Book

2017 World Games
2017